The Raid on Haverhill was a military engagement that took place on March 15, 1697 during King William's War.  Ordered by Louis de Buade de Frontenac, Governor General of New France, French, Algonquin, and Abenaki warriors descended on Haverhill, then a small frontier community in the Province of Massachusetts Bay.  In the surprise attack, the Abenaki killed 27 colonists and took 13 captive.  The natives burned six homes.  The raid became famous in the nineteenth century because of Hannah Dustin's captivity narrative as a result of the raid.

Afterward 

The last battle of the war was on September 9, the Battle of Damariscotta, in which Captain John March killed 25 native men.

Even after the war was officially ended, Abenaki raids on the English colonists continued.  On March 4, 1698 Pigwacket Abenaki Chief, Escumbuit led a group of 30 Indians in a raid on Andover, Massachusetts, the last and most severe Indian raid on this town. There was also another raid by the Natives of Acadia on Hatfield, Massachusetts in 1688, where they killed two settlers.

Legacy 
 Henry David Thoreau A Week on the Concord and Merrimack Rivers (1849)
 Nathaniel Hawthorne  "The Duston Family." The American Magazine of Useful and Entertaining Knowledge, (1836)
 John Greenleaf Whittier in his short story "The Mother’s Revenge" (1831)
 Cotton Mather Magnalia Christi Americana (orig. pub. 1702).

See also 
Dustin House

References 
Texts
 Caverly, Robert B. Heroism of Hannah Duston: Together With the Indian Wars of New England (orig. pub. 1875). Bowie, Md.: Heritage Books, 1990. 
Samuel Drake. The Border Wars of New England
 Mather, Cotton. Magnalia Christi Americana (orig. pub. 1702). New York: Russell & Russell (Atheneum House), 1967. ASIN B0007DLZGI
 Namias, June. White Captives: Gender and Ethnicity on the American Frontier. University of North Carolina Press, 1993. 
 Sayre, Gordon M., ed. American Captivity Narratives.  Houghton Mifflin, 2000. 

Endnotes

External links 
Images - Raid on Haverhill/ Dustin Family

1697 in Massachusetts
1697 in North America
Events in Essex County, Massachusetts
Haverhill, Massachusetts
King William's War
Military history of New England
Pre-statehood history of Massachusetts
Battles involving the Abenaki
Battles in Massachusetts